was a town located in Nyū District, Fukui Prefecture, Japan.

As of 2003, the rural town had an estimated population of 10,333 and a density of 243.19 persons per km2. The total area was 42.49 km2.

On February 1, 2006, Shimizu, along with the village of Koshino (also from Nyū District), and town of Miyama (from Asuwa District), was merged into the expanded city of Fukui.

Dissolved municipalities of Fukui Prefecture
Fukui (city)